Balatonfüredi Kézilabda Sport Egyesület is a Hungarian team handball club from Balatonfüred, that currently plays in the Nemzeti Bajnokság I. The team won promotion to the top division in 2007 and achieved their best ever result in 2009 by finishing fifth. In the 2009–2010 Hungarian Cup campaign the club finished third, but as the two finalists, MKB Veszprém KC and Pick Szeged already secured their places in the EHF Champions League, BKSE got the right to represent Hungary in the EHF Cup Winners' Cup next season.

Crest, colours, supporters

Naming history

Kit manufacturers and shirt sponsor
The following table shows in detail Balatonfüredi KSE kit manufacturers and shirt sponsors by year:

Kits

Sports Hall information
Name: – Balaton Szabadidő és Konferencia Központ
City: – Balatonfüred
Capacity: – 712
Address: – 8230 Balatonfüred, Horváth Mihály u. 64.

Management

Team

Current squad 

Squad for the 2022–23 season

Technical staff
 Head coach:  László György
 Assistant coach:  Vilmos Imre
 Coach:  Igor Zubjuk
 Goalkeeping coach:  János Szathmári
 Fitness coach: Dániel Lattenstein
 Physiotherapist:  Tamás Szabó
 Masseur:  Richárd Rácz
 Club Doctor:  Dr. József Csordás

Transfers
Transfers for the 2023–24 season

Joining 
  Aleksandr Ermakov (LP) (from  Chekhovskiye Medvedi)
  Dávid Ubornyák (CB) (from  Tatabánya KC)

Leaving 
  Balázs Németh (CB) (to  Csurgói KK)
  Dejan Malinović (RB) (to ?)
  Huba Vajda (LP) (to  Tatabánya KC)

Top scorers

Honours

Individual awards

Domestic
Nemzeti Bajnokság I Top Scorer

Recent seasons

Seasons in Nemzeti Bajnokság I: 12
Seasons in Nemzeti Bajnokság I/B: 11
Seasons in Nemzeti Bajnokság II: 3

European competition

EHF Cup Winners' Cup: from the 2012–13 season, the men's competition was merged with the EHF Cup.EHF Cup: It was formerly known as the IHF Cup until 1993. Also, starting from the 2012–13 season the competition has been merged with the EHF Cup Winners' Cup. The competition will be known as the EHF European League from the 2020–21 season.

European record
As of 30 September 2020:

Overall results by opponent and country

EHF ranking

Former club members

Notable former players

 Arián Andó
 Dávid Bakos
 Bence Bánhidi
 Tamás Bene
 László Béres
 Bendegúz Bóka
 Ádám Borbély
 Dániel Bősz
 Zsolt Cziráki
 Dávid Debreczeni
 Rudolf Faluvégi
 Nándor Fazekas (2015–2020)
 János Frey
 Péter Gulyás
 Mátyás Győri
 János Gyurka
 Tamás Habuczki
 Péter Hornyák
 Tamás Iváncsik
 László Kemény
 Ákos Kis (2008–2015)
 Attila Kotormán
 Péter Kovacsics
 Patrik Ligetvári
 Dominik Máthé
 Árpád Mohácsi
 István Pásztor
 Pedro Rodríguez Álvarez
 Timuzsin Schuch
 János Szathmári
 Zoltán Szita
 Márton Székely
 Zsolt Szobol
 Balázs Szöllősi
 Bence Szöllősi
 Bence Szűcs
 Csaba Tombor
 Petar Topic
 Huba Vajda
 Milán Varsandán
Uroš Vilovski
 Bence Zdolik
 Dejan Malinović
 Tarik Vranac
 Artur Karvatski
 Aliaksei Shynkel
 Da Silva Uelington Ferreira
 Josip Šandrk 
 Stanislav Kašpárek
 Mateo Dioris
 Oscar Rio Rasillo
 Luis Felipe Jiménez Reina
 Mihail Petrovski
 Aleksandar Glendža
 Radivoje Ristanović
 Aleksey Grigoriev
 Yury Semenov
 Milan Gostović (2021–)
 Miljan Ivanović
 Darko Stevanović
 Maroš Čorej
 Alexander Ivanov
 Ottó Kancel
 Igor Zubjuk

Former coaches

References

External links
 
 Balatonfüredi KSE at EHF 
 

 
Hungarian handball clubs
Handball clubs established in 1990
1990 establishments in Hungary
Sport in Veszprém County